Ceanothus oliganthus is a species of shrub in the family Rhamnaceae known by the common name hairy ceanothus or hairy-leaf ceanothus.

The variety of this species known as jimbrush (var. sorediatus) is sometimes treated as a separate species.

Habitat and range
It occurs in California and Baja California, where it occurs through all of the coastal mountain ranges in dry habitat such as chaparral.

Description
This is a large, erect shrub approaching 3 meters in maximum height.

Leaves and stems
The stipules (small leaf-like structures on the stems at the base of the leaf stem, are thin and fall off early.

The evergreen leaves are alternately arranged and may be up to 4 centimeters long. They are dark green on top, paler and hairy on the underside, and are edged with glandular teeth. Leaves have 3 main veins rising from the base. Leaves have a toothed edge. The leaf is covered with short, soft hairs on the top.

Branchlets are flexible, not stiff.

Inflorescence and fruit
The inflorescence is a cluster or series of clusters of blue or purple flowers.

The fruit is a capsule which may be hairy or not, depending on variety.

The fruit is not horned.

It blooms April to May.

References

External links
Jepson Manual eFlora (TJM2) treatment of Ceanothus oliganthus
Ceanothus oliganthus — U.C. Photo gallery

oliganthus
Natural history of the California chaparral and woodlands
Natural history of the California Coast Ranges
Natural history of the Peninsular Ranges
Natural history of the San Francisco Bay Area
Natural history of the Santa Monica Mountains
Natural history of the Transverse Ranges
Flora of Baja California
Plants described in 1838
Taxa named by Thomas Nuttall
Flora of Baja California Sur